The National Computer Science School (NCSS) is an annual computer science summer school open to high school students in Australia and New Zealand. It has taken place annually since 1996 over an eleven-day period in the January school holidays. Attending students participate in an intensive course in computer programming with Python, culminating in the development of a final project. The School also incorporates a number of social activities, competitions and outings.

Participants usually reside in The Women's College at the University of Sydney during the school. In 2020, the University of Melbourne hosted an additional node on their campus.

In 2023, NCSS will no longer operate at the University of Sydney, instead running concurrently at the University of Melbourne and at UNSW Sydney.

Eligibility 
Each year, NCSS is open to all students in Australia and New Zealand entering their penultimate or final year of high school, but also considers applications from particularly gifted students from previous years. NCSS does not assume that participants have previous programming or web design experience, and is designed to suit a wide range of abilities and experience. Some students who have participated in the program are invited back the following year and are known internally as "returners".

2012 saw the first student from the Northern Territory.

2015 saw the first student siblings.

Project
Students attending NCSS are split into two streams: the 'web' stream and the 'embedded' steam. The web stream studies Python and other web technologies, while the embedded stream experiment with the BBC micro:bit, flashed with MicroPython firmware.

Each stream usually contains 4 groups, who each work on a final project under the guidance of a mentor or a tutor. Groups in the web stream develop a projects such as a website, app, or chatbot, while groups in the embedded stream design a robotics project.

History 
The National Computer Science School has been offered since 1996, albeit in various formats. Prior to 2010, the main NCSS project required (re)designing the web site and building a search engine for a charitable organisation. In the past, these have included:

 2009: Youth Insearch
 2008: Youth Off The Streets
 2007: Hands of Help
 2006: Conservation Volunteers Australia
 2005: Stewart House

In 2010, the project was changed to no longer actively involve charities.

In 2020, the University of Melbourne hosted an additional node on their campus. However, this was cancelled in 2021 due to the COVID-19 pandemic. Instead, in 2021, the event was only held in Sydney with fewer participants than usual.

In 2022, for the first time since its inception, the NCSS did not run due to the COVID-19 pandemic.

In 2023, for the first time since its inception, the NCSS will not run at the University of Sydney, instead relocating to the University of New South Wales.

Social activities
The summer school includes a number of games and activities to entertain students, which are usually hosted each the evening. These may include-

 Trivia Night
 Treasure Hunt
 Cryptography Challenge
 Programming Challenge
 Simulation (where teams compete to act out various algorithms)
 Afternoon Outing

References

External links
 School of Information Technologies - University of Sydney
 NCSS Challenge
 National Computer Science School

Schools of the University of Sydney